Balch Hall is the only remaining all-female dormitory on the North Campus of Cornell University. Technically, Balch Hall consists of four eighty-student halls, hence the more accurate name the Balch Halls, which has fallen out of use. Balch Hall is open only to female freshman and is divided into sections, known as units, each with a Residential Advisor who helps the new students acclimate themselves with the campus.  This dorm is unique due to its old fashioned design as each room has a personal sink, or shares a sink with one other room.  The dorm also houses the Carol Tatkon Center in which the residents can borrow movies, games, baking pans and other similar objects.

History

In 1920, Cornell founded a committee to research the feasibility of constructing a new women's dormitory to meet the needs of the growing community. In 1922, Frederick L. Ackerman submitted a basic plot for the construction of a dormitory on North Campus and, with approval of the university's Architectural Advisory Board, began seeking donors with the promise that Cornell would pay for up to half of the building's construction. In 1928, the university accepted the $1,650,000 donation of Allen C. Balch 1889 and Janet Balch, a graduate student from 1886 to 1888. When Balch opened in September 1929, it became the third female residential college at Cornell, after Sage College and Risley Hall.

According to legend, Janet Balch insisted that her husband donate the money for the dormitory after attending an event at Allen's fraternity, Alpha Delta Phi. The story goes that Mrs. Balch was offended by the behavior of the undergraduate brothers at an Alpha Delta Phi function. She insisted that her husband should not donate further funds to the fraternity and instead build a dormitory dedicated to the welfare of female students.

To this day, as the Balches requested, the dormitory has remained an all-female dormitory.

Facilities

On North Campus, Balch stands out for its majestic English Renaissance style. Originally, each of the four halls were decorated differently in "Early American, Georgian, English Jacobean, and modern Gramercy Park". At the end of Spring 2000 semester, the dining hall was closed and has been converted into a student center, cafe, and lecture hall known as the Carol Tatkon Center. The dorm rooms are unique in that each has its own working sink.

In popular culture
Balch Hall (or a model of it) was used in the film Love Potion No. 9 when Paul, the male lead character, uses the potion to take advantage of the all female dormitory. This section of the film shows lights in different rooms turning on and off to the sounds of Beethoven's 5th Symphony as he "visits" the different women. Paul is quickly arrested for this disturbance.

References

Cornell University dormitories
Residential buildings completed in 1928
1928 establishments in New York (state)